Basappa Danappa Jatti  (10 September 1912 – 7 June 2002) was the fifth vice president of India, serving from 1974 to 1979. He was the acting president of India from 11 February to 25 July 1977.He also served as the chief minister of Karnataka. Jatti rose from a being a Municipality member to India's second-highest office during a five-decade-long chequered political career.

Early life
Jatti was born in a Kannada speaking Lingayat family at Savalgi in Jamkhandi Taluk of Bijapur district in present-day Karnataka on 10 September 1912. His parents were Dasappa Jatti and Sangamma. Jatti studied at the Bijapur Government High School and obtained a Bachelor of Arts degree from Rajaram College and a degree in law from the Sykes Law College, Kolhapur. Jatti practiced as a lawyer for a while in Jamkhandi before being elected to the Jamkhandi municipality in 1940 and going on to become its president. He was elected to the Jamakhandi State Legislature, becoming a minister and subsequently its chief minister.

Early political career
In 1940, he entered politics as a Municipality member at Jamkhandi and subsequently became the president of the Jamkhandi Town Municipality in 1945. Later, he was elected as a member of the Jamkhandi State Legislature and was appointed a minister in the government of the princely state of Jamkhandi. Finally, he became the 'dewan' (chief minister) of Jamkhandi state in 1948. As dewan, he maintained cordial relations with the Maharaja, Shankar Rao Patwardhan, and brought about the accession of the small principality to the Indian Union. On 8 March 1948 after Jamkhandi was merged with Bombay state, he returned to legal practice and continued with it for 20 months.

Later, Jatti was nominated as a member of the Bombay State Legislative Assembly to represent the merged area, and within a week of his nomination, he was appointed Parliamentary Secretary to the then Bombay chief minister, B. G. Kher. He worked in that capacity for a couple of years. After the 1952 general elections, he was appointed Minister of Health and Labour of the then Bombay government and held that post till the reorganization of states. His autobiography, 'I'm my own model', is very popular.

Chief minister of Mysore state
Jatti became a member of the Mysore Legislative Assembly after the reorganization and was Chairman of the Land Reforms Committee, which paved the way for the 1961 Mysore Land Reforms Act (which abolished the tenancy system and absentee landlordism). He was the chief minister and Kadidal Manjappa was the revenue minister when the bill was adopted. In 1958, when S. Nijalingappa stepped down as chief minister of the state, Jatti was elected leader of the party in the face of a stiff challenge from Congress veteran T. Subramanya. He became the chief minister of Mysore in 1958 and continued in that office until 1962.

In the assembly election of 1962 to the Mysore Legislative Assembly, Jatti was reelected from Jamkhandi. He however was forced to resign as chief minister since he did not command the support of a majority of elected legislators of the Congress Party and was succeeded by S. R. Kanthi.

Later political career
Jatti subsequently was Lieutenant Governor of Pondicherry from October 1968 to November 1972. Jatti was appointed Governor of Orissa in November, 1972. On March 1, 1973 the ruling Congress government led by Nandini Satpathy resigned after it lost its majority in the legislative assembly. Although the leader of the opposition, Biju Patnaik, staked his claim to form the government and demonstrated the support of a majority of legislators, Jatti chose to prorogue the assembly session on the advice of Sathpathy and on March 3, 1973 recommended President’s rule in the state. Jatti, with the aid of advisors administered the state during the period of President’s Rule which continued until Mach, 1974. He resigned as governor in August, 1974 to contest in the vice presidential election of 1974. In the election, Jatti defeated the opposition candidate N.E. Horo winning 521 votes in the electoral college against 141 polled by Horo. Jatti was declared elected on 27 August 1974 and sworn in as the vice president of India on August 31, 1974.

Following the death in office of Fakhruddin Ali Ahmed on February 11, 1977, Jatti was sworn in as the acting president of India the same day. Following the defeat of the Indian National Congress in the general elections of 1977, Jatti asked Indira Gandhi to continue as caretaker prime minister and, on the recommendation of the Cabinet, revoked the Emergency on March 21, 1977. Jatti swore in Morarji Desai as prime minister on March 24, 1977. In April, 1977, the new government recommended the dismissal of governments and the dissolution of legislative assemblies in states ruled by the Congress Party. Although Jatti initially hesitated to accept the Cabinet’s recommendation, he agreed to it a day later and dismissed governments in nine states. Jatti was succeeded by Neelam Sanjiva Reddy as President of India on 25 July 1977 following his unopposed election to the presidency in the presidential election of 1977.

Public offices held
 1945–48: Minister for Education in the erstwhile princely state of Jamkhandi 
 1948 : Chief Minister (dewan) of Jamkhandi 
 1948–52: Parliamentary Secretary in the B. G. Kher Government in erstwhile Bombay State
 1953–56: Deputy Minister for Health and Labour in the Morarji Desai Government in Bombay 
 1958–62: Chief Minister of Mysore state
 1962–68: Cabinet minister, Government of Mysore
 1968–72: Lieutenant Governor of Pondicherry 
 1972–74: Governor of Odisha 
 1974–79: Vice-President of India 
 Acting President for six months in 1977

Religious activities
A deeply religious man, Jatti was the founder president of the "Basava Samithi", a religious organisation which propagated the preachings of 12th-century saint, philosopher and reformer of Lingayat community Basaveshwara. The Basava samithi established in 1964 has published many books on Lingayatism and Sharanas and has got the 'vachanas' of sharanas translated into various languages.  He was also involved in various organisations concerned with social activities.

Death and legacy
He died on 7 June 2002. He was hailed as a man who set an example of selfless service and stood for value-based politics. He was once called an ordinary man with extraordinary thought, and he named his autobiography, I'm My Own Model. His centenary celebrations were held in 2012.

See also

List of Chief Ministers of Karnataka
Governors and Lieutenant-Governors of states of India
List of Governors of India

Notes

References

|-

|-

|-

|-

External links

1912 births
2002 deaths
Chief Ministers of Karnataka
Governors of Odisha
History of Mumbai
20th-century Indian lawyers
Kannada people
Lingayatism
Lieutenant Governors of Puducherry
People from Bagalkot district
Presidents of India
Vice presidents of India
Acting presidents of India
Chief ministers from Indian National Congress
People from Jamakhandi
Mysore MLAs 1952–1957
Mysore MLAs 1957–1962
Mysore MLAs 1967–1972
Members of the Mysore Legislature
Indian National Congress politicians